Cyrenella is a fungus genus in the class Cystobasidiomycetes, containing the single species Cyrenella elegans.

References

External links 

Basidiomycota enigmatic taxa
Monotypic Basidiomycota genera